The Dagmar was a sports version of the Crawford Automobile, made in Hagerstown, Maryland from 1922 to 1927 by the Crawford Automobile Company following their purchase by the M. P. Moller Pipe Organ Co. Several hundred Dagmars were produced.

The Dagmar was considered one of the sportiest-looking cars of its day, featuring disc-covered artillery wheels, brass trim, and straight 'military' wings. They were usually painted in pastels. Two sizes of cars were produced, using six-cylinder engines produced by either Continental or Lycoming. The make later served as a base model for the Standish automobile and the Luxor taxicab.

See also
List of defunct automobile manufacturers

References

Defunct motor vehicle manufacturers of the United States
Cars introduced in 1922
Hagerstown, Maryland
Vehicle manufacturing companies established in 1922
American companies established in 1922
1922 establishments in Maryland
Vehicle manufacturing companies disestablished in 1927
American companies disestablished in 1927
1927 disestablishments in Maryland
Defunct manufacturing companies based in Maryland